A Book on Angling – Being a complete treatise on the art of angling in every branch is a work of angling literature with significant fly fishing content written by Francis Francis, angling editor to The Field and published in London in 1867 by Longmans, Green and Company.

Synopsis
A Book on Angling is best described by the author himself in the preface to the first edition:
When first infected with the fever of Angling, more years ago than I care to count up, my ambition was to catch every species of freshwater fish, from the minnow up to the salmon, which inhabits our British waters. That satisfied, my next desire was to write a work, which should contain within one volume (as far as might be possible) the fullest and most varied information upon Angling generally, in every branch of the art, which had ever been published; and with this resolve I commenced collecting the matter for the present work nearly twenty years ago. Taken up and laid aside from time to time, little by little it has steadily progressed towards completion. In the course of that twenty years I took occasion to visit and to fish nearly every river of note in the kingdom, my connection with 'The Field' affording me peculiar facilities for obtaining permission to fish very many waters which are closely locked against the general public; and I have roamed England, Scotland, Wales, and Ireland over to gather fresh knowledge, and to put it into a practical and concentrated form for the use of my readers.

In inducting the tyro into the mysteries of the art, I have endeavored to make every direction and information as clear and practicable as possible. This work is intended to be a useful and not merely a decorative one: thus, the plates are not for the sake of ornamentation, but for direction, and as an aid to the student of tackle-making and fly-tying. Each illustration of tackle is really needed, and the flies shown are not a mere selection of gorgeous and pretty subjects, or I should have chosen very differently; but each fly is a specimen of some separate class of flies, in which a special peculiarity of manufacture is evident.

I have to thank many kind friends for assistance in lending tackle and flies as subjects for the engravings, and also for description, as will be found in the body of the work.

I have given much time to this book, but I have given it willingly, for it was indeed and in truth a labour of love. Whether the Angling public, to whom I dedicate it (desiring no more potent patron), will appreciate my labours remains to be seen; and so, without further apology if an attempt to supply a long-felt and obvious want, the existence of which few persons have been in a position to know and feel so well as myself, be thought to require an apology into their hands I commit it.

FRANCIS FRANCIS. THE FIRS, TWICKENHAM : 1867

Reviews
In 1881, Osmund Lambert in Angling Literature in England wrote:

In 1920, when A Book on Angling was reprinted, Sir Herbert Maxwell, a noted Scottish angler penned this in the Editor's Introduction:

James Robb in an entire chapter devoted to Francis Francis in Notable Angling Literature (1945) said of A Book on Angling:

In 1974, noted American writer Arnold Gingrich in his The Fishing in Print commented on Francis, Francis as a writer and his influence on notable American angler Theodore Gordon:

In 2002, 135 years after the 1st edition of A Book of Angling, Tony Hayter in his biography of Frederic M. Halford wrote:

Contents
From the 4th Edition (1876)

 Chapter I – Bottom-Fishing
 The Origin of Angling, Pond-Fishing, Punt-Fishing, The Norfolk Style, Bank-Fishing, The Gudgeon, The Pope, The Bleak, The Roach, The Rudd, The Dace, The Chub, The Barbel – 1
 Chapter II – Bottom-Fishing Continued.
 Nottingham Angling, Casting From the Reel, Daceing, Tight Corking, The Slider, etc. – 61
 Chapter III – Bottom-Fishing Continued
 The Bream, The Carp, The Tench, The Eel, The Perch, Paternostering, etc. – 73
Chapter IV – Mid-Water Fishing.
The Pike, Spinning, Trolling With the Dead Gorge, Live Baiting, etc. – 100
 Chapter V – Artificial Fly-Fishing.
 Varieties of Trout, Instructions as to Rods and Tackle, How To Use Them, Weather, How To Choose Flies, Dress, Night-fishing -138
 Chapter VI – Artificial Flies
Contrast of Systems, Copying Nature And Copying Nothing, List of Flies For Each Month -185
 Chapter VII – On Lake-Fishing, Etc.
Lake-Fishing, Daping, The Creeper, The Beetle, The Worm – 250
 Chapter VIII – Spinning For Trout
Spinning for Large Trout, Spinning for Trout In Small Streams, The Par-Tail, The Grayling – 278
 Chapter IX – The Salmon
 The Rod, The Reel and Line, How To Use Them, Casting, Striking, Playing A Salmon, Sea-Trout Fishing – 303
 Chapter X – Salmon Flies.
 List of Salmon Flies, General Flies, List of Flies for Scotch Rivers – 333
 Chapter XI – Salmon Flies Continued.
 List of Flies for Irish Rivers – 392
 Chapter XII – Salmon Flies Continued
 List of Flies for Wales and England, List of Sea-Trout Flies – 426

Other Editions

From Antiquarian Book Exchange and Bibliotheca Piscatoria-A Catalogue Of Books On Angling, The Fisheries and Fish-Culture, With Bibliographical Notes and an Appendix Of Citations Touching On Angling and fishing from Old English authors, Westwood and Satchell (1883)

Further reading

See also
Bibliography of fly fishing

External links
 1876 4th Edition on the Internet Archive
 1920 Edition with Introduction by Sir Herbert Maxwell on the Internet Archive
 1920 US Edition on the Internet Archive

Notes

1867 books
Angling literature
Fly fishing literature
British books
Recreational fishing in the United Kingdom